The surname Ajami or al-Ajami (Arabic: عجمي ʿajamī) has origins in the Middle East and is prevalent in Arabic speaking countries. Derived from Ajam (عجم) it is an Arabic word meaning mute, which today refers to someone whose mother tongue is not Arabic.

List of people with the surname

 Fouad Ajami - Lebanese-born scholar, author and professor 
 Ismail al-'Ajami - Persian leader of the Order of Assassins (Nizari Isma'ili sect) 
 Newsha Ajami - Iranian-American hydrologist
 Habib al-Ajami - Muslim Sufi (mystic), saint, and traditionalist of Persian descent
 Jocelyn Ajami - Lebanese-American artist and filmmaker of the 20th and 21st centuries
 Mohammed al-Ajami - Qatari poet
Mary Ajami - Syrian Christian academic, was a feminist and pioneering Arabic-language writer

See also
Ajami (disambiguation)

Arabic-language surnames